John Elliott (8 June 1931 – 30 March 2015) was a Jamaican boxer. He competed in the men's light middleweight event at the 1964 Summer Olympics.

References

1931 births
2015 deaths
Jamaican male boxers
Olympic boxers of Jamaica
Boxers at the 1964 Summer Olympics
Sportspeople from Kingston, Jamaica
Light-middleweight boxers
20th-century Jamaican people